Update is a jazz album produced by 44 Records and producer Jacky Wagner, released in 2004.   The album was critically acclaimed by Jazz Podium magazine as the first initial recording for the Berlin Jazz Orchestra with vocal artist Marc Secara. Jazz artist Jiggs Whigham is featured on this release as both instrumentalist (trombone) and musical director and Steve Gray's arrangements are featured on this recording.

Background 
After being founded in 2000, the Berlin Jazz Orchestra had their first release with the label 44 Records in 2004 (Update) produced by Jacky Wagner.  Roughly the same program was to be released later in 2007 for You're Everything and also adding two more Steve Gray works to include an original composition and vocal suite.  The Update CD release was widely accepted by critics and many details of Steve Gray's arrangements were worked out in the studio.

Track listing

Recording sessions 
 2004, Berlin, Traumton - Studios (17 piece ensemble)

Personnel

Musicians 
Conductor and solo trombone: Jiggs Whigham 
Arranger: Steve Gray 
Vocals: Marc Secara
Alto Saxophone: Jonas Schoen, Nico Lohmann
Tenor Saxophone: Patrick Braun, Thomas Walter
Baritone Saxophone: Nik Leistle
Trumpet: Daniel Collette, Jürgen Hahn, Martin Gerwig, Nikolaus Neuser
Trombone: Arne Fischer, Christoph Hermann, Ralf Zickerick, Simon Harrer
Piano: Claus-Dieter Bandorf
Guitar: Jeanfrançois Prins
Bass: Ralph Graessler
Drums: Tobias Backhaus
Percussion: Uli Moritz

Production 

Executive producer: Jacky Wagner
Producer: Jiggs Whigham
Associate Producer:  Marc Secara
Recording engineers: Staff for Traumton - Studios
Mixing engineer and mastering: Traumton - Studios
Liner notes: Jacky Wagner

Reception

talented hopefuls for the Big Band...Marc Secara and his Berlin Jazz Orchestra have already acquired a reputation for being equipped with a big voice and tasteful timbre, he is 'guilty of nothing'... What the band, had a 'so-called' Background to offer...a smooth hit.

Jazzpodium

Release history

See also 
Berlin Jazz Orchestra
Marc Secara
Jiggs Whigham

References

External links 

 

2004 albums
Jazz albums by German artists
Big band albums
Vocal jazz albums